Taylor Opera House was an opera house in Trenton, New Jersey. It was the city's first theater, and was founded by John Taylor, creator of Pork Roll and one of Trenton's leading citizens.   The building first opened March 18, 1867 at 18 S. Broad Street.  A historical marker was placed on the site after its demolition.

The theater presented the major speakers and performers of the day, including Mark Twain, Ethel Barrymore, and George M. Cohan, and played host to political conventions, Bible conferences, musical revues and local meetings and events.  It hosted the inaugurations of Governor George B. McClellan in 1877, and Woodrow Wilson in 1910, James F. Fielder in 1914 and Walter Evans Edge in 1917.

In 1921, it was converted into a movie and vaudeville palace known as Keith's Capitol Theatre; after later sales it was renamed the RKO International.

The theater was razed by its next door neighbor (the Trenton Saving Fund Society) to create a parking lot in 1969.

References

Music venues completed in 1867
Theatres in New Jersey
History of Trenton, New Jersey
Buildings and structures in Trenton, New Jersey
Buildings and structures demolished in 1969
Theatres completed in 1867
1867 establishments in New Jersey
Demolished buildings and structures in New Jersey
Former theatres in the United States